This is a list of all the known Macedoniarchs, an official that was the head of the Koinon of Macedonians. It is known that there were only 11 such officials.

List
Claudius Rufrius Meno
Septimus Insteianus Alexandros
Silvanus Celer
Poplius Aelius Nicanor
Valerius Philoxenos

References

Citations

Books

Ancient Greek titles
Government of Roman Macedonia